Halestan may refer to:
 Halestan, Gilan
 Halestan, Mazandaran